John Jaques may refer to:

John Jaques (clergyman), 18th-century clergyman of the Church of England
John Jaques (Mormon), 19th century Latter Day Saint hymnwriter, missionary, and historian
John Jaques, of Jaques of London